Scotty Sadzoute (born 29 April 1998) is a French professional footballer who plays as a left-back for Nîmes, on loan from OH Leuven.

Career
In 2013, Sadzoute left his local town in Réunion to start a footballing career in mainland France. In 2014, he joined the youth academy of Lille OSC, and in 2018 signed his first professional contract with them. He joined Pau FC on loan for the 2019–20 season, and helped them get promoted into the Ligue 2. He extended his loan with Pau into the 2020–21 season. Sadzoute made his professional debut with Pau in a 3–0 Ligue 2 loss to Valenciennes on 22 August 2020.

In 2021, Sadzoute signed for Oud-Heverlee Leuven until 2024, but did not play for the club in the first six months and only featured as an unused substitute in one match. On the last day of the winter 2021–22 transfer window, Sadzoute was loaned to Nîmes until the end of the 2022–23 season, with option to buy.

Personal life
Sadzoute is of Réunionnais and Malagasy descent, and is open to representing both the France and Madagascar national football teams.

References

External links
 
 

1998 births
Living people
People from Le Port, Réunion
French people of Réunionnais descent
French sportspeople of Malagasy descent
French footballers
Footballers from Réunion
Association football fullbacks
Ligue 2 players
Championnat National players
Championnat National 2 players
Championnat National 3 players
Belgian Pro League players
Pau FC players
Oud-Heverlee Leuven players
Nîmes Olympique players
French expatriate sportspeople in Belgium
Expatriate footballers in Belgium